Rokopella is a genus of living monoplacophoran.

References

Monoplacophora